Cecilia Dahlman (born 24 July 1968) is a retired Swedish tennis player, who played professionally between mid 1980s and 1993.

Tennis career
Cecilia Dahlman won two WTA singles titles during her career, the Athens Open in 1989 and 1990. She also represented Sweden in the Fed Cup.

WTA Tour finals

Singles 2

ITF finals

Singles finals: (4-5)

Doubles finals (1-2)

References

External links
 
 

1968 births
Living people
Swedish female tennis players
Sportspeople from Lund
20th-century Swedish women
21st-century Swedish women